The Museum of Vertebrate Zoology is a natural history museum at the University of California, Berkeley.  The museum was founded by philanthropist Annie Montague Alexander in 1908.  Alexander recommended zoologist Joseph Grinnell as museum director, a position he held until his death in 1939.

The museum became a center of authority for the study of vertebrate biology and evolution on the West Coast, comparable to other major natural history museums in the United States.

It has one of the nation's largest research collections of mammals, birds, amphibians and reptiles, and the largest collection of any university museum.
  The museum is located on the UC Berkeley campus, in the Valley Life Sciences Building, on the 3rd floor, entrance at room 3101.

Footnotes

External links
 

 UC Berkeley Interactive Map - Museum is in Valley Life Sciences Building (3rd floor)

Museums in Berkeley, California
Museums established in 1908
Natural history museums in California
University museums in California
University of California, Berkeley buildings
Science and technology in the San Francisco Bay Area
1908 establishments in California